The British Banking School was a group of 19th century economists from the United Kingdom who wrote on monetary and banking issues. The school arose in opposition to the British Currency School; they argued that currency issue could be naturally restricted by the desire of bank depositors to redeem their notes for gold. According to Jacob Viner the main members of the Banking School were Thomas Tooke, John Fullarton, James Wilson, and J. W. Gilbart. They believed "The amount of paper notes in circulation was adequately controlled by the ordinary processes of competitive banking, and if the requirement of convertibility was maintained, could not exceed the needs of business for any appreciable length of time".  Thus they opposed the requirement in the Bank Act of 1844 for a reserve requirement on banknotes.

Creation of Banking School versus Currency School 
During the early and mid 19th century Britain had been plagued economically due to the conversion of currency from gold to a paper currency. This switch to inconvertible currency spiraled Britain's economy into a financial crisis. Throughout this period of time two financial groups were formed, these groups were known as the British Banking School and the British Currency School.

Economic beliefs 
The British Banking school opposed the views carried by the British Currency School on notes and deposits. There were two main arguments presented by the British Banking School. One being, that both notes and deposits perform the same economic function. Secondly, they argued that no restrictions should be placed on either notes or deposits except for the convertibility to coin form. They believe no restrictions should be made because, "money is seen as a means of exchange which is spontaneously—or market-endogenously, as it is called—created among traders." The banking position was summed up perfectly by Viner when he stated, "The amount of paper notes in circulation [is] adequately controlled by the ordinary processes of competitive banking, and if the requirement of convertibility was maintained, could not exceed the needs of business for any appreciable length of time" (Viner 1937, p. 223). Meaning, the demand of credit in business relies heavily on banking policy and their interest rates.

Peel's Act reaction 
In 1844, the Bank Charter Act, also known as the Peel's act, was passed. This act was initially a loss for the British Banking School because it split the bank into two branches, a branch for the notes and a branch for the deposits. "The act imposed what was essentially a 100-percent reserve requirement onto the note-issuing department."  However, in 1847 severe economic panics resulted from the Peel's Act, causing the 100 percent reserve requirement to be suspended to keep the banks afloat. Nonetheless, this crisis in 1847 validated many of the Banking School's beliefs such as money should not be restricted but naturally run. The Peel's act resulted in multiple victories. As Mises states, "Although the Currency School enjoyed the de jure success, de facto victory went to the Banking School."

References

Further reading 

 O'Brien, D. P. (ed.) (1994). Foundations of monetary economics. vol. 5 The Banking School. London: W. Pickering.
 Read, Charles (2022). Calming the storms : the carry trade, the banking school and British financial crises since 1825. Cham, Switzerland: Palgrave Macmillan.
Schools of economic thought
Banking in the United Kingdom
Economic history of the United Kingdom
Monetary economics